The Crag Rats are the oldest volunteer mountain search and rescue organization in the United States. Based in Hood River, Oregon, the Crag Rats are an all-volunteer, nonprofit rescue agency that primarily covers Mount Hood and the Columbia River Gorge.

History 
As a charter member of the Mountain Rescue Association, they were founded in 1926 by A.L. Anderson, a lumberman from Hood River, after a search for missing seven year old on Mt. Hood. Their name originates from a wife of a founding member, who stated that the men spent so much time on the crags of the mountain that they were like "crag rats".

Operations 
Working under the direction of local authorities like the Hood River County Sheriff's office, they regularly conduct rescue operations for those lost, stranded, or injured in the popular recreation areas surrounding the Columbia River Gorge National Scenic Area and Mount Hood National Forest. In 2022, they responded to over 50 search and rescue incidents just through September. Since the 1950s, the club has maintained Cloud Cap Inn on the mountain as a base.

References

External links 
 

1926 establishments in Oregon
Mountain rescue agencies